This is a list of devices used for recording various aspects of the weather.

Typical instruments
Weather stations typically have these following instruments:
 Thermometer for measuring air and sea surface temperature
 Barometer for measuring atmospheric pressure
 Hygrometer for measuring humidity
 Anemometer for measuring wind speed
 Pyranometer for measuring solar radiation
 Rain gauge for measuring liquid precipitation over a set period of time.
 Wind sock for measuring general wind speed and wind direction
 Wind vane, also called a weather vane or a weathercock: it shows which way the wind is blowing.
 Present Weather/Precipitation Identification Sensor for identifying falling precipitation
 Disdrometer for measuring drop size distribution
 Transmissometer for measuring visibility
 Ceilometer for measuring cloud ceiling
 Sialometer for measuring sial materials like dew.
Cat

Observation systems
 Argo
 Global Atmosphere Watch
 Automatic weather station
 Remote Automated Weather Stations (RAWS)
 Automated Surface Observing System (ASOS)
 NEXRAD radar
 Global Sea Level Observing System
 SST buoys
 Hurricane Hunters
 Dropsonde
 SNOTEL
 Weather balloon
 Weather vane
 Windsock
 Thermometer
Anemometer
Hygrometer

Obsolete observation systems
WSR-57
WSR-74

Orbital instrumentation
 AIRS
 AMSU-A
 ASTER
 Aqua
 Aura
 AVHRR
 CALIPSO
 CloudSat
 CERES
 DMC
 Envisat
 EROS
 GOES
 GOMOS
 GRACE
 Hydros
 ICESat
 IKONOS
 Jason-1
 Landsat
 MERIS
 MetOp
 Meteor
 Meteosat
 MLS
 MIPAS
 MISR
 MODIS
 MOPITT
 MTSAT
 NMP
 NOAA-N'
 NPOESS
 OMI
 OCO
 PARASOL
 QuickBird
 QuikSCAT
 RADARSAT-1
 SCIAMACHY
 SeaWiFS
 SORCE
 SPOT
 TES
 Terra
 TRMM

Obsolete orbital instrumentation
 ERS
 Nimbus program
 Project Vanguard
 Seasat
 TOPEX/Poseidon
 TIROS

See also
 Automated Quality control of meteorological observations
 Convective storm detection
 Earth Observing System
 Environmental monitoring
 Geographic information system (GIS)
 Glossary of meteorology
 Mesonet
 Meteorology
 Radiosonde
 Rocketsonde
 Surface weather observation
 Timex Expedition WS4
 Tropical cyclone observation
 Weather reconnaissance
 Weather radar
 Weather satellite

Meteorological instrumentation and equipment